William Knibb, OM (7 September 1803 in Kettering – 15 November 1845) was an English Baptist minister and missionary to Jamaica. He is chiefly known today for his work to free enslaved Africans.

On the 150th anniversary of the abolition of slavery in the British Empire, Knibb was posthumously awarded the Jamaican Order of Merit. He was the first white male to receive the country's highest civil honour.

Early life
William was born in Kettering, Northamptonshire. His father was a tradesman, Thomas Knibb, and his mother, Mary (née Dexter) was active in the local independent church. His parents had eight children, the eldest, also named Thomas being born on 11th October 1799. William was their fifth child, along with his sister, Ann.

Knibb's elder brother Thomas was a missionary-schoolmaster in Jamaica. When Thomas died at 24, William volunteered to replace him. A dedication service was held in Bristol on 7 October 1824, two days after he had married Mary Watkins (or Watkis). The newly-weds sailed to Jamaica on 5 November 1824, when William was aged only 21.

Knibb found six English Baptist missionaries, African-Caribbean Baptist deacons, and thriving congregations already in Jamaica when he arrived. Together they were following the pioneering work of the African preacher George Lisle, a former slave from Virginia who had arrived in 1782 and founded a Baptist church in Kingston. Knibb began work as the schoolmaster of the Baptist mission school in Kingston and worked closely with fellow missionaries Thomas Burchell and James Phillippo, who formed a trio. In 1828 he moved to Savanna-la-Mar. In 1830 he became the minister responsible for the Baptist church at Falmouth, which had regular congregations of 600 when he arrived. He remained there as minister until he died.

Attitude to slavery
The Baptists in Jamaica were founded by freed slaves, notably George Lisle, who sought support and finance for schools and chapels from nonconformists abroad, particularly from the English Baptist movement, which William Knibb contributed to. Jamaica had become a major sugar exporter, relying on slavery. Knibb sided with the slaves and the cause of emancipation.

Knibb made his feelings clear. When Sam Swiney, a black slave, was unjustly accused of a minor offence, Knibb spoke for him in court. In a gross miscarriage of justice, the colonial authorities convicted Swiney and had him flogged. But Knibb refused to let the matter drop, and published details in an island newspaper, for which he was threatened with a prosecution for libel. His account reached the Secretary of State in London, who eventually dismissed from office the two responsible magistrates.

Knibb and his Baptist colleagues were instrumental in opposing the repeated attempts by the House of Assembly to enact draconian legislation in Jamaica during the 1820s, the Consolidated Slave Law, and in persuading the British parliament to forbid the passage of the law.

Not surprisingly, Knibb was highly popular with the slaves. Not long afterwards the church in Falmouth needed a minister and Knibb's name was put forward. The missionary who chaired the meeting recorded that when he proposed Knibb should be their new minister and asked for a show of hands, the entire membership stood up, held up both hands, and wept.

Violence
At this time pressure was growing in Britain for the abolition of slavery in the British colonies. The colonial authorities exerted all their political influence to halt this movement, while the slaves' excitement and anticipation grew. Eventually this unstable mix resulted in the Baptist War, led by Samuel Sharpe. The colonial authorities enacted harsh measures to suppress the revolt, treating the missionaries with great suspicion. Knibb himself was placed under armed guard and only obtained bail through the intervention of two prominent colonialists.

In the mayhem Bridges, an Anglican clergyman, formed an association of white Jamaicans to oppose the anti-slavery movement by all necessary means. This 'Colonial Church Union' used the cover of martial law to attack numerous abolitionist clergymen. White planters burned down a dozen Baptist chapels, including Knibb's at Falmouth. They forced many missionaries to leave Jamaica, but not Knibb. The planters plotted to murder him, but the plot became known and Knibb's family found refuge with one of the leading islanders. After his release, for three successive nights a group of 50 white planters stoned his lodging.

Jamaica's advocate
In 1832 the Baptist slaves of Jamaica decided to send Knibb back to England to plead their cause. Once home he toured England and Scotland, speaking at public meetings. He told the truth about the good work being done by the nonconformist churches in Jamaica, and about the treatment of the enslaved population.

Knibb himself later recalled his efforts.

Knibb was summoned to appear before committees of both Houses of Parliament that had been convened to investigate the state of the West Indian colonies.

Abolition
At last in May 1833 a Bill for the Abolition of Slavery in the Colonies was introduced. This was enacted later that year. The date for the termination of slavery was 1 August 1834, but slaves had to endure a further six-year 'apprenticeship' before they were granted full freedom. The planters ruthlessly abused this provision. A new law was passed by the Jamaican House of Assembly to thwart the intention behind the Act. This Jamaican legislation prevented emancipation by compelling former slaves to work in an apprenticeship scheme under which the proceeds of their work were to be used to buy out inflated apprenticeship values of £60, £80, or £90 or higher, as set by their former owners. Knibb and others opposed these abuses, so that Parliament brought forward the date for full emancipation from 1840 to 1838.

Education and social care
With emancipation came great social changes. At a stroke thousands of slave children also became free, for whom there was no education provided. Knibb did what he could, but was hampered by a lack of teachers. Upon emancipation, the adult slaves were released into a world without any education or institutions to support them. The church ministers were often the only people to whom the freed slaves could go for legal advice. Knibb remarked that "Often I have had persons come to me for advice who have walked twenty miles to ask for it."

Knibb helped to raise money to purchase thousands of acres of land, to enable 19,000 former slaves to own their own property.

Religious revival

With emancipation also came great religious changes. During 1838-45 came the religious revival known as the Jamaican Awakening. Many thousands of former slaves joined the nonconformist churches. Knibb recalled that "in those seven years, through the labour of about twenty [Baptist] missionaries, 22,000 people were baptised upon their profession of faith in Jesus Christ". Knibb personally baptised 6,000 converts, and translated the Bible into Creole, the native language of the slaves.

In 1839 the Birmingham Anti-Slavery Society became the Birmingham Branch of the British and Foreign Anti-Slavery Society. This society was planning a major convention in 1840 with Joseph Sturge taking the lead. Knibb as invited. Thomas Swan, who led Birmingham's Cannon Street Baptist chapel, was able to meet Knibb who he and Joseph Sturge had worked hard to support. Knibb had already encouraged his congregation in Jamaica to take unilateral action and free any of their unpaid staff. Knibb had brought with him to England two deacons from Jamaica named Edward Barrett and Henry Beckford. These two men spoke to 5,000 people at Birmingham Town Hall and Beckford became the central figure in Haydon's painting that commemorated the World Anti-Slavery Convention.

By 1845, the Baptists in Jamaica had built 47 new chapels to replace those burned down by the Colonial Church Union. Many of the churches, almost entirely made up of former slaves, were financially independent. Knibb's own church at Falmouth had grown over the previous ten years from 650 to 1,280 members. Over 3,000 adults had been baptised, two thirds of whom had been sent out to form new churches. Six daughter churches were planted by the Falmouth church alone. Knibb was personally associated with the founding of 35 churches, 24 missions, and 16 schools. Knibb bought land in 1845 which he used to create the village of Granville, Jamaica that was named after Granville Sharp.

Death

Knibb died of fever in Jamaica on 15 November 1845, aged 42, and was buried at his Baptist Falmouth Chapel, the service attracting eight thousand African islanders. His funeral sermon by pastor Samuel Oughton was taken from Zechariah, xi, 2 "Howl, fir tree, for the mighty cedar is fallen".

In 1988, the 150th anniversary of the abolition of slavery in the British Empire, Knibb was posthumously awarded the Jamaican Order of Merit; the first white man to receive the country's highest civil honour.

Notes

References
Catherine Hall. Civilising Subjects: Colony and Metropole in the English Imagination, 1830-1867. Chicago: University of Chicago Press, 2002.
J. H. Hinton, Memoir of William Knibb, Missionary in Jamaica, 1847, accessed April 2009.

External links
The National Portrait Gallery has a collection of portraits of Knibb.
Alan Jackson has a detailed article on Knibb on the Victorian Web.
Kettering Borough Council has a leaflet that emphasises the Kettering (UK) connections.
There is a considerable Knibb-related bibliography under the K/NIBB/S One Name Study at the RootsWeb  genealogy site.

Other sources
The official archive for Knibb, formerly held by the Baptist Missionary Society, is held by the Regents Park College Library, Oxford.
The classic biography, by a contemporary and published within two years of the subject's death, is J. H. Hinton's Life of William Knibb, London, 1847. The work by Peter Masters (Masters, P., 2006: Missionary triumph Over Slavery: William Knibb and Jamaican Emancipation, Wakeman Trust, London. ) is mostly an abridged and updated version of Hinton.
E. Wyn James, "Welsh Ballads and American Slavery" , Welsh Journal of Religious History, 2 (2007), pp. 59–86. . Includes references to Knibb and his Welsh-speaking wife, and to a Welsh translation of his address in Exeter Hall, London in 1832.
Morrison, Doreen. 2014. Slavery's Heroes: George Liele and the Ethiopian Baptists of Jamaica 1783 - 1865. CreateSpace. . A section of the book tells of how William Knibb as a part of the Baptist Missionary Society took over the reins of leadership of Baptists in Jamaica, and his increasing sympathy for their cause (Emancipation) following the death and execution of African Baptist  leaders prior to and following the Baptist War 1831 - 1832.

1803 births
1845 deaths
19th-century English Baptist ministers
Baptist abolitionists
Baptist missionaries in Jamaica
English abolitionists
English Baptist missionaries
People from Kettering
Recipients of the Order of Merit (Jamaica)